Section 51 (xii): is a subsection of Section 51 of the Constitution of Australia, that gives the Commonwealth Parliament the right to legislate with respect to “currency, coinage, and legal tender.”

Generally, powers in section 51 of the Constitution of Australia can also be legislated on by the states, although Commonwealth law will prevail in cases of inconsistency.  However, the currency power must be read in conjunction with other parts of the Constitution of Australia. Section 115 of the Constitution establishes “a state shall not coin money, nor make anything but gold or silver coin a legal tender in the payment of debts”.  This section effectively makes the concurrent power in section 51(xii) exclusive to the Commonwealth.

Despite this, coins of the Australian pound were not introduced until 1910, following the enactment of the Coinage Act 1909. The federal government did not issue banknotes until 1913, following the passage of the Australian Notes Act 1910.  From 1901 to 1910 the states could not issue tender and the Commonwealth had not issued tender, so private currency was used as the common medium of exchange whilst the British pound sterling was the national unit of account.

See also

 Bank Notes Tax Act 1910

References

 

Australian constitutional law